CHAMP1-associated intellectual disability syndrome, also known as autosomal dominant intellectual disability type 40 is a rare genetic disorder which is characterized by intellectual disabilities, developmental delays, facial dysmorphisms, and other anomalies.

Signs and symptoms 

Individuals with the disorder often show the following signs and symptoms:
 Intellectual disabilities
 Speech delays
 Epicanthic fold
 Drooping of the lower lip
 Feeding difficulties
 Hypotonia of the face
 Ataxia
 Hyperopia
 High palate
 Widespread developmental delays
 Gastroesophageal reflux
 Widespread hypotonia
 Decreased sense of pain detection
 Joint hypermobility
 Long face
 Constantly open mouth
 Prognathism (pointy chin)
 High occurrence of respiratory tract infections
 Short philtrum
 Stereotypy
 Tented upper lip vermilion
 Upslanted palpebral fissures
 Strabismus
 Autism/autistic-like behaviour

Causes 

As its name suggests, this condition is caused by mutations in the CHAMP1 gene, in chromosome 13q34. These mutations are most often missense or nonsense mutations. These are usually sporadic, meaning the condition is not inherited from the parents. However, if people with the disorder were to reproduce, they would have a 1 in 2 chance of giving their children a copy of the gene, since this disorder is autosomal dominant, which means that only one copy of a mutated gene (whether inherited or from a spontaneous error in cell division) is needed to pass it on to a child.

Epidemiology 

According to OMIM, only 36 cases have been described in medical literature.

References 

Genetic diseases and disorders

Rare genetic syndromes
Syndromes affecting the gastrointestinal tract
Congenital disorders of eye, ear, face and neck
Developmental disabilities
Neurodevelopmental disorders